Club Deportivo Alhaurino is a Spanish football team based in Alhaurín el Grande, in the autonomous community of Andalusia. Founded in 1908 it plays in Tercera División, holding home matches at Estadio Miguel Fijones, with a capacity of 1,500 seats.

Season to season

20 seasons in Tercera División
 CD Alhaurino First and U23 teams ( ex coach Eduard Ciulin now at F.C. PRO Romania ).

External links
Official website 
Futbolme.com profile 
lapreferente.com profile

Football clubs in Andalusia
Association football clubs established in 1930
Divisiones Regionales de Fútbol clubs
1930 establishments in Spain
Province of Málaga